Sir Andrew Clark, 1st Baronet  (28 October 18266 November 1893), was a Scottish physician and pathologist.

Early life and education
He was born in Aberdeen, the illegitimate son of Amelia Anderson and Andrew Clark. His mother died at his birth, and is father, who also was a physician, died when he was seven years old. After attending school in Aberdeen, he was sent by his guardians, two wealthy uncles, to Dundee, attending the High School of Dundee and was then apprenticed to a pharmacist. On returning to Aberdeen, he began his medical studies at the University of Aberdeen. Soon, however, he went to Edinburgh, where in the extra-academical school he had a student's career of the most brilliant description, ultimately becoming assistant to Dr John Hughes Bennett in the Pathology Department of the Edinburgh Royal Infirmary and assistant demonstrator of anatomy to Robert Knox. But symptoms of tuberculosis brought his academic life to a close and, in the hope that the sea might benefit his health, he joined the medical department of the Royal Navy in 1848.

Career
In 1849 he became pathologist to the Haslar Hospital where T.H. Huxley was one of his colleagues and in 1853 he was the successful candidate for the newly instituted post of curator to the museum of the London Hospital. There he intended to devote all his energies to pathology, but circumstances brought him into active medical practice. In 1854, the year in which he took his doctor's degree at Aberdeen, the post of assistant physician to the hospital became vacant and he was prevailed upon to apply for it. He was fond of telling how his tuberculosis tendencies gained him the appointment. "He is only a poor Scotch doctor," it was said, "with but a few months to live; let him have it." He had it, and two years before his death publicly declared that of those who were on the staff of the hospital at the time of his selection he was the only one remaining alive.

In 1854, he became a member of the Royal College of Physicians, and in 1858 a fellow, and then went in succession through all the offices of honour the college has to offer, ending in 1888 with the presidency, which he continued to hold until his death. From the time of his selection as assistant physician to the London Hospital, his fame rapidly grew until he became a fashionable doctor with one of the largest practices in London, counting among his patients some of the most distinguished men of the day. The great number of persons who passed through his consulting-room every morning rendered it inevitable that to a large extent his advice should become stereotyped and his prescriptions often reduced to mere stock formulae, but in really serious cases he was not to be surpassed in the skill and carefulness of his diagnosis and in his attention to detail.

Honours
He delivered the Lumleian Lectures in 1867 and the Croonian Lecture in 1885 to the Royal College of Physicians, both on the subject of pulmonary conditions.

He was created a baronet in 1883 in recognition of his services to medical science. He was elected the same year President of the Clinical Society of London. 

In June 1885 he was elected a Fellow of the Royal Society. 

He was elected President of the Royal Medical and Chirurgical Society in 1892.

Writing
In spite of the claims of his practice he found time to produce a good many books, all written in the precise and polished style on which he used to pride himself. Doubtless owing largely to personal reasons, lung diseases and especially lung fibrosis formed his favourite theme, but he also discussed other subjects, such as kidney failure, anemia, constipation, etc.

Personal life
In 1891, his daughter Mary Kane married zoologist Oldfield Thomas.

Death
He died in London, after a paralytic stroke, and was buried at Essenden, near his country house at Hatfield, Hertfordshire.

References

External links

AIM25 Archives in London

1826 births
1893 deaths
People from Aberdeen
People educated at the High School of Dundee
Alumni of the University of Aberdeen
Alumni of the University of Edinburgh
Baronets in the Baronetage of the United Kingdom
Fellows of the Royal College of Physicians
Presidents of the Royal College of Physicians
Fellows of the Royal Society
Scottish non-fiction writers
Scottish pathologists